Terrence Shannon Jr. (born July 30, 2000) is an American college basketball player for the Illinois Fighting Illini of the Big Ten Conference. He previously played for the Texas Tech Red Raiders.

Early life and high school career
Shannon was interested in basketball from a young age, especially after experiencing a growth spurt early in high school. He attended Lincoln Park High School in Chicago, averaging 15 points, 7.5 rebounds and 2.7 assists per game as a senior. Shannon was also a receiver on the school's football team. After having no NCAA Division I basketball scholarship offers by the end of his senior season, he reclassified to the 2019 class and moved to IMG Academy in Bradenton, Florida. He drew attention from college programs due to his success with Mac Irvin Fire on the Amateur Athletic Union circuit. A four-star recruit, he originally committed to DePaul before switching his commitment to Texas Tech. He chose the Red Raiders over offers from DePaul, Florida State, Georgetown and Illinois.

College career
On December 4, 2019, Shannon recorded a freshman season-high 24 points and eight rebounds in a 65–60 overtime loss to DePaul. As a freshman, he averaged 9.8 points and 4.1 rebounds per game, earning Big 12 All-Freshman Team honors. Entering his sophomore season, Shannon was named to the Julius Erving Award watch list. On April 8, 2021, Shannon declared for the 2021 NBA draft while maintaining his college eligibility. He ultimately returned to Texas Tech. On November 7, Shannon was suspended indefinitely due to an eligibility review. He was reinstated on November 17, after missing three games. As a junior, he averaged 10.4 points, 2.6 rebounds, and 0.8 steals per game. On March 25, 2022, Shannon entered the transfer portal. On April 29, 2022, he committed to Illinois.

Career statistics

College

|-
| style="text-align:left;"| 2019–20
| style="text-align:left;"| Texas Tech
| 29 || 21 || 23.5 || .470 || .257 || .829 || 4.1 || 1.0 || .9 || .4 || 9.8
|-
| style="text-align:left;"| 2020–21
| style="text-align:left;"| Texas Tech
| 28 || 13 || 26.7 || .448 || .357 || .756 || 4.0 || 1.4 || 1.1 || .1 || 12.9
|-
| style="text-align:left;"| 2021–22
| style="text-align:left;"| Texas Tech
| 26 || 20 || 25.0 || .455 || .384 || .784 || 2.6 || 2.0 || .8 || .2 || 10.4
|- class="sortbottom"
| style="text-align:center;" colspan="2"| Career
| 83 || 54 || 25.0 || .456 || .351 || .789 || 3.6 || 1.4 || 1.0 || .3 || 11.0

Personal life
Shannon is the son of Treanette Redding and Terrence Shannon Sr. His father, attended training camp with the Detroit Pistons in 2004.

References

External links
Texas Tech Red Raiders bio

2000 births
Living people
American men's basketball players
Basketball players from Chicago
Illinois Fighting Illini men's basketball players
IMG Academy alumni
Shooting guards
Small forwards
Texas Tech Red Raiders basketball players